Jesse Anthony Rodriguez is a Salvadoran swimmer who lives and trains in Los Angeles, California. He previously trained with the Trojan Swim Club, a professional swim club on the USC campus. Jesse won the 200m Breaststroke at the El Salvador Short Course Meter National Championships in October 2013. He finished 4th in the 100m Breaststroke. In February 2014 he competed at the Copa El Salvador/CAC and CAMEX Games trials where he won two silver medals in the 50m Breaststroke and 100m Breaststroke. Jesse was part of the national team that competed at the CAMEX Games 2014 in Panama City, Panama. He finished 4th in the 100m Breaststroke and 6th in the 50m and 200m Breaststroke. Jesse competed at El Salvador Short Course Nationals 2014 where he won the 50m Breaststroke and 100m freestyle.

References

External links
 n1casino.com зеркало — n1casino зеркало официального сайта
 老子有钱娱乐官网_老子有钱线上娱乐{唯一}官网平台
 Trojan Swim Club :

Salvadoran male swimmers

Living people
Year of birth missing (living people)